The 1990 Brandenburg state election was held on 14 October 1990 to elect the members of the first Landtag of Brandenburg. It was the first election held in Brandenburg since the reunification of Germany, which took place on 3 October. The Social Democratic Party (SPD) led by Manfred Stolpe emerged as the largest party with 38.2% of the vote, followed by the Christian Democratic Union (CDU) with 29.6%. The SPD subsequently formed Germany's first traffic light coalition with the Free Democratic Party (FDP) and Alliance 90, and Stolpe became Brandenburg's first post-reunification Minister-President.

Parties
The table below lists parties which won seats in the election.

Election result

|-
! colspan="2" | Party
! Votes
! %
! Seats 
! Seats %
|-
| bgcolor=| 
| align=left | Social Democratic Party (SPD)
| align=right| 487,134
| align=right| 38.2
| align=right| 36
| align=right| 40.9
|-
| bgcolor=| 
| align=left | Christian Democratic Union (CDU)
| align=right| 374,572
| align=right| 29.4
| align=right| 27
| align=right| 30.7
|-
| bgcolor=| 
| align=left | Party of Democratic Socialism (PDS)
| align=right| 170,804
| align=right| 13.4
| align=right| 13
| align=right| 14.8
|-
| bgcolor=| 
| align=left | Free Democratic Party (FDP)
| align=right| 84,501
| align=right| 6.6
| align=right| 6
| align=right| 6.8
|-
| bgcolor=| 
| align=left | Alliance 90 (B90)
| align=right| 81,725
| align=right| 6.4
| align=right| 6
| align=right| 6.8
|-
! colspan=8|
|-
| bgcolor=| 
| align=left | The Greens (Grüne)
| align=right| 36,238
| align=right| 2.8
| align=right| 0
| align=right| 0
|-
| bgcolor=| 
| align=left | The Republicans (REP)
| align=right| 14,631
| align=right| 1.1
| align=right| 0
| align=right| 0
|-
| bgcolor=|
| align=left | Others
| align=right| 24,301
| align=right| 1.9
| align=right| 0
| align=right| 0
|-
! align=right colspan=2| Total
! align=right| 1,273,906
! align=right| 100.0
! align=right| 88
! align=right| 
|-
! align=right colspan=2| Voter turnout
! align=right| 
! align=right| 67.1
! align=right| 
! align=right| 
|}

Sources
 Amtliches Endergebnis der Landtagswahl in Brandenburg 1990

Elections in Brandenburg
Brandenburg
October 1990 events in Europe